Hirhafek (also written Hirafok, Hirhafok or Highafok) is a village in the commune of Idlès, in Tazrouk District, Tamanrasset Province, Algeria. It is located on the southern side of the N55 national highway between In Amguel to the west and Idlès to the east.

References

Neighbouring towns and cities

Populated places in Tamanrasset Province